The Great Jazz Trio at the Village Vanguard Again is a live album by the Great Jazz Trio – pianist Hank Jones, bassist Ron Carter and drummer Tony Williams – recorded in 1977 for the Japanese East Wind label but not released until 2000.

Reception 

Allmusic awarded the album 4 stars, stating: "Hank Jones generously showcases his bandmates, bassist Ron Carter and Tony Williams, rather than relegating them strictly to supporting roles as far too many piano trio leaders have done. Each track is an extended workout."

Track listing
 "Hi-Fly" (Randy Weston) - 12:02
 "Sophisticated Lady" (Duke Ellington, Mitchell Parish) - 8:19
 "Softly, as in a Morning Sunrise" (Oscar Hammerstein II, Sigmund Romberg) - 9:53
 "Wave" (Antônio Carlos Jobim) - 8:12
 "My Funny Valentine" (Lorenz Hart, Richard Rodgers) - 12:39

Personnel 
 Hank Jones - piano
 Ron Carter - bass
 Tony Williams - drums

References 

2000 live albums
Great Jazz Trio live albums
East Wind Records live albums
Albums recorded at the Village Vanguard